The 2010 Ohio Attorney General election was held on November 6, 2010, concurrently with other statewide offices including a Class 1 Senate election as well as the Governor election. Incumbent Democratic Attorney General Richard Cordray who was elected in a 2008 special election ran for a full 4-year term but was defeated by Republican challenger and former 2-term United States senator Mike DeWine. Being decided by 1.2%, this was the closest statewide election in Ohio. Cordray and DeWine would later face off against each other again in the 2018 Governor election.

Background
In 2008 then Ohio State Treasurer Richard Cordray ascended to the office of Attorney General following his victory in a 2008 special election triggered by the resignation of Marc Dann. Cordray won his election in a landslide winning by 18 percentage points being held concurrently with the Presidential election when Barack Obama carried the state by a bit under 5 percentage points. During Cordray's tenure, he got involved in cases against the Bank of America Corporation as well as the American International Group.

In 2009 former United States Senator Mike DeWine announced he would seek the office of Attorney General, 3 years after Sherrod Brown defeated him in the 2006 election. Due to the growing unpopularity of the Obama administration many political observers predicted 2010 would be a tough year for Democrats. As such, polling predicted that DeWine had a narrow edge over Cordray.

Democratic primary

Candidates

Declared
 Richard Cordray, incumbent Attorney General,  former Ohio State Treasurer, former Ohio House of Representatives member from the 33rd district, former Treasurer of Franklin County, former Solicitor General of Ohio, nominee for OH-15 in 1992, nominee for Attorney General in 1998, and candidate for U.S. Senate in 2000.

Results

Republican primary

Candidates

Declared
 Mike DeWine, former U.S. Senator, former lieutenant governor of Ohio, and  former U.S. Representative.

Results

General election

Polling

Endorsements

Results

Footnotes

2010 Ohio elections
2010
Ohio